Sthuthi Nawatha Enna (Thank you, Come again) is a 2010 Sri Lankan Sinhala drama film directed by Sumith Rohana Thiththawelgala and produced by Mangala Madugalla for Rawana Films. It stars Bimal Jayakody and Damitha Abeyratne in lead roles along with Hemasiri Liyanage and Jagath Benaragama Ramindu Benaragama. Music composed by Gayan Ganakadara. It is the 1141st Sri Lankan film in the Sinhala cinema.

At the end of 50 days, the film grossed more than 80 SLR lakhs.

Plot

Cast
 Damitha Abeyratne
 Bimal Jayakody as Keerthiratne
 Hemasiri Liyanage as Keerthiratne's father
 Jagath Benaragama
 Ramindu Benaragama
 Jayani Senanayake
 Udeni Alwis
 Keerthi Ranjith Peiris
 Asela Jayakody as Malkanthi

References

2010 films
2010s Sinhala-language films